Daniel Jositsch (born 25 March 1965 in Zürich) is a Swiss politician, member of the Social Democratic Party of Switzerland (SP), representing the canton of Zürich in the Swiss Council of States since 2015.

Biography 
Born in the municipality of Zürich, Jositsch grew up in the Limmat Valley and is citizen of the municipality of Geroldswil in the canton of Zürich. His ancestors He studied law at the University of St. Gallen. In 2004 he qualified as a professor at the University of Zurich, and was appointed as Associate Professor of Criminal Law and Criminal auxiliary sciences. In 2012 Jositsch was promoted by the university council to full professor.

In spring 2007 Jositsch was elected as a member of the SP Zürich in the parliament of the Canton of Zürich, and since October 2007 he was a member of the Swiss National Council. In the first round of the 2015 Council of States elections in the canton of Zürich, Jositsch won the majority, and for the first time since 32 years, a SP politician will represent the canton of Zürich in the Swiss Council of States (Ständerat).

Personal life 
Daniel Jositsch is divorced and father of a son born in 2004. He was in a relationship with Chantal Galladé.

The SP said on occasion of Jositsch's nomination as candidate for Ständerat that he comes from a Jewish refugee family. My great-grandfather came from Ukraine to Switzerland in the 19th century, Jositsch explained on occasion of an interview, his Jewish roots are important...I feel connected to this tradition. Although the Judaism does not define his everyday life, but as a parliamentarian I take myself to the interests of the Jewish minority. His great-grandfather Hersch Josselowitsch took citizenship in the municipality of Geroldswil in 1913 after immigrating from Ukraine. The spelling of the name was germanized to the current Jositsch. Daniel Jositsch is a dual-citizen of Switzerland and Colombia.

End of October 2015 Jositsch announced to stand for the five-person chairmanship of the Israelitische Cultusgemeinde Zürich (ICZ), the largest Jewish community in Switzerland, on 2 December 2015. The candidacy is a private commitment without a professional or political context.

References

External links

  
 

1965 births
Living people
Members of the Council of States (Switzerland)
Members of the National Council (Switzerland)
Politicians from Zürich
Academic staff of the University of Zurich
Social Democratic Party of Switzerland politicians
University of St. Gallen alumni
People from Dietikon District
Geroldswil
People from Stäfa
20th-century jurists
21st-century scholars
Swiss jurists
Swiss educational theorists
20th-century Swiss historians
Swiss male writers
Swiss Jews
Jewish Swiss politicians
21st-century Swiss historians
20th-century Swiss politicians
21st-century Swiss politicians